Carlos Loizaga was member of the Paraguayan Triumvirate established by the occupying allied forces following the death of Francisco Solano López from 15 August 1869 to 31 August 1870.

Paraguayan people of Basque descent
Year of death missing
Year of birth missing